Select or SELECT may refer to:

Arts, entertainment, and media
 Select (album), an album by Kim Wilde
 Select (magazine), a British music magazine
 MTV Select, a television program
 Select Live, New Zealand's C4 music program
 Selects, Zakir Hussain album

Brands and enterprises
 Select (fashion chain), UK women's fashion/clothing retailer
 Select Citywalk, a shopping mall in Delhi, India
 Select Sport A/S, a Danish sports equipment manufacturer
 Select (aperitif), an Italian aperitif

Technology
 Select (SQL), a keyword in SQL
 select (Unix), a system call (in sys/select.h or unistd.h) for polling multiple file descriptors
 , an HTML element
 Cable select, a setting on Advanced Technology Attachment (ATA) devices that allows position on the cable to determine the role of a drive
 Quick select, an algorithm to select the kth-smallest element of an array

Other uses
 SELECT (Electrical Contractors' Association of Scotland)
 Selenium and Vitamin E Cancer Prevention Trial, a prostate cancer prevention trial

See also
 Selection (disambiguation)